Associação Desportiva Cabofriense, commonly known as Cabofriense, is a Brazilian professional association football club based in Cabo Frio, Rio de Janeiro. The team plays in Série D, the fourth tier of the Brazilian football league system, as well as in the Campeonato Carioca, the top tier of the Rio de Janeiro state football league.

History

The club was founded on November 15, 1955, as Associação Atlética Cabofriense, and after the team retired from professional competitions in 1993, some of the club's former officials formed a new team in 1997, called Associação Desportiva Cabofriense. Associação Desportiva Cabofriense then changed its name to Cabo Frio Futebol Clube in 1999. In 2001, Cabo Frio changed its name back to Associação Desportiva Cabofriense.

Current squad

Honours
 Campeonato Carioca Série A2:
 Winners (5): 1986, 1998, 2002, 2010, 2013

Stadium

The club play its home games at Correão stadium. The stadium has a maximum capacity of 4,200 people.

Mascot

The club's mascot is a marlin fish, named Espada ("sword" in Portuguese). According to Cabofriense's website, the marlin was chosen as a mascot because it represents strength, vigor, combativeness and technique.

References

External links
Official site 

 
Association football clubs established in 1997
Football clubs in Rio de Janeiro (state)
1997 establishments in Brazil